Old Norse poetry encompasses a range of verse forms written in Old Norse, during the period from the 8th century (see Eggjum stone) to as late as the far end of the 13th century. Much of this poetry was originally preserved in oral culture, but Old Norse ceased to be spoken and modern knowledge is preserved through what was written down. Most of this Old Norse poetry that survives was composed or committed to writing in Iceland after the introduction of Christianity brought along with it refined writing techniques, but there are also around 122 verses preserved in Swedish rune inscriptions, 54 in Norwegian and 12 in Danish.

Poetry played an important role in the social and religious world of the Vikings. In Skáldskaparmál (1), Snorri Sturluson, recounts the myth of how Odin brought the mead of poetry to Asgard. Poetry is referred to in such terms as 'the drink of the raven-god (= Odin)' even in the oldest preserved poetry, which is an indicator of its significance within the ancient Scandinavian culture.

Old Norse poetry developed from the common Germanic alliterative verse, and as such has many commonalities with Old English, Old Saxon, and Old High German poetry, including alliteration, poetic circumlocutions termed kennings, and an expansive vocabulary of poetic synonyms, termed heiti.

Old Norse poetry is conventionally, and somewhat arbitrarily, split into two types: Eddaic poetry (also sometimes known as Eddic poetry) and Skaldic poetry. Eddaic poetry refers to poems on themes of mythology or ancient heroes, composed in simpler meters (see below) and with anonymous authors. Most of the Eddaic poems are preserved in the Codex Regius manuscript, but a few others survive in manuscripts like the fragmentary AM 748 I 4to. On the other hand, Skaldic poetry was usually written as praise for living kings and nobles, in more intricate meters and by known authors, known as skalds.

Types of poetry
There are various types of Old Norse poetry which have been preserved. Of particularly of interest to scholars are the Skaldic and Eddic lays, or poems. However, also of interest are occasional verse from other sources. Skaldic and Eddic works have many commonalities besides being written in Old Norse, such as alliteration; however, scholars usually distinguish the two based on certain characteristics.

Distinction between Skaldic and Eddic poetry
Scholarly distinction between Eddic and Skaldic works largely derives both from differing manuscript traditions and their typical matter and style.

Manuscript sources
One major distinction between Skaldic and Eddic poetry derives from the manuscript sources of the surviving known works. The large majority of works described as "Eddic" ultimately derive from one main source, the Poetic Edda, attributed to Snorri Sturluson, (1179–1241), who relied on earlier sources about which little is specifically known, however other poems not found in the earliest versions of the "Poetic Edda" are also considered to be "Eddic". Examples include the "Lay of Ríg" from the Codex Wormianus; the "Lay of Hyndla" from the Flatey-jarbók; and, the "Lay of Svipdag", which is only found in later, paper manuscripts (rather than vellum).

Matter and style
Compared to the main skaldic style, the Eddic lays tend to be differentiated by three characteristics: the material deals with the mythology, ancient heroes, and ethics of the ancient Norse. Furthermore, the Eddic style is characterized by relative simplicity in terms of style and meter and, "like the later folk songs and ballads, they are anonymous and objective, never betraying the feelings or attitudes of their authors." In contrast, the skaldic poetry tends to concern itself with contemporary events and personalities, although also sometimes dealing with or alluding to myth and legend; skaldic poetry avoids direct narration; and, it is often known who the authors of the skaldic verses are along with their dates, unlike the Eddic poetry.

Metrical forms

Old Norse poetry has many metrical forms. They range from the ancient and relatively simple fornyrðislag ('air of ancient utterings'), closely related to the Old English meter, to the innovative and complex dróttkvætt ( 'court-spoken meter').

Eddaic metrical forms
In Eddaic poetry, the metric structures are generally simple, and are almost invariably in fornyrðislag or ljóðaháttr ('meter of songs'). Because of its structure, which comprises clearly defined rhythmic stanzas, ljóðaháttr lends itself to dialogue and discourse. Fornyrðislag is the more commonly used of the two, and is generally used for narrative poems. Also used is Málaháttr ('meter of speeches'), closely related to fornyrðislag, but with longer lines, similar to the meter of the Old Saxon Heliand, and Galdralag ('the tune of galdrar'), a ljóðaháttr variant which contains a fourth line which echoes and varies the third line.

Skaldic metrical forms
In Skaldic poetry, the structures used tend to be complex, and quite far removed from the common Germanic poetic tradition. Around a hundred meters are known, many only from Snorri Sturluson's Háttatal. Some of the more important ones are
 Kviðuháttr, a variant of fornyrðislag with alternating lines of 3 and 4 syllables, used in genealogical poems such as Þjóðólfr ór Hvínis Ynglingatal and Eyvindr Skáldaspillir's Háleygjatal
 Hrynhenda, a variant of dróttkvætt, where each line comprises four metrical feet rather than three, giving a more flowing feel.

See also

 Alliterative verse
 Kennings
 List of kennings
 Skald

External links
Table of poems archived from dead link at abdn.ac.uk

References

 Den norsk-islandske skjaldedigtning ved Finnur Jónsson, 1912–1915
 Carmina Scaldica udvalg af norske og islandske skjaldekvad ved Finnur Jónsson, 1929

 
Sources of Norse mythology
Poetry by language
Old Norse literature
Icelandic literature